Halkyn United Football Club were a Welsh football club representing the Flintshire villages of Halkyn, Pentre Halkyn and Rhosesmor, near Mold, in Wales. They played their home games at Pant Newydd, which is also home to Halkyn Cricket Ground. Previously, during the 2018–19 season, they had been named Halkyn Mountain Football Club.

History
Halkyn United Football Club was formed in 1945 in the aftermath of the Second World War and became founder members of the old Halkyn Mountain League, which was a forerunner to the Clwyd League. It is believed that during this period of the club's history the club played their home games on various grounds within the village of Pentre Halkyn.
  
The earliest honours won by Halkyn were the Mountain League in 1956 and the League Cup in 1959. After years playing in the Mountain League, the club joined the Clwyd League in 1975 and played their home matches in Pentre Halkyn on a field owned by the council. This field was adjacent to the Village Park in Pentre Halkyn, the changing facilities being the nearby community centre.

Many of the current long-serving officials involved with the club's modern-day success started to arrive at the club in the late 1980s and the 1990s. In the 1992–93 season under manager George Thelwell the club won the Clwyd League Division One title and with it promotion to the Premier League. In the first season in the Premier League despite finishing midway in the league United won both the Presidents Cup and the Arrows Cup. Further progress up the pyramid system was achieved, and in the season 1994–95 Halkyn achieved promotion as champions from the Clwyd East Football League to the Welsh Alliance League. Success continued with the prestigious Barritt Cup making its way to Halkyn in the season 1995–96 and the Cookson Cup the following season.

Throughout their four years in the Welsh Alliance the club competed well and made steady progress. In the 1997–98 season a fourth-place finish was achieved behind runaway champions Holyhead Hotspurs. However, the following season brought the club down to earth with an indifferent season culminating in a mid-table finish. The 1999–2000 season proved the most successful in the club's history, as they won the Tyn Lon Rover Welsh Alliance by a clear 11 points whilst remaining unbeaten in the League. Added to that the club progressed to the fourth round of the Welsh Cup including an away victory at League of Wales outfit Haverfordwest County.

The club managed to stay in the Cymru Alliance for a few seasons, but the 2005–06 season proved too much of a challenge for them, and they finished bottom of the table. This ensured the club would be relegated, and would play their football in the Welsh Alliance for the 2006–07 season. Promotion to the Cymru Alliance meant work was required at Pant Newydd to bring the ground up to the required standard. A makeshift stand was built and changes made to the rooms and the showers. More changes are in the pipeline as Halkyn strive to continue building the football club.

In the 2015–16 season the club resigned their place in the Welsh Alliance League Division 2.  They then joined the Clwyd East Football League for the subsequent season.

In the 2016–17 season the club resigned their place in the Clwyd East Football League after 20 games, with  all results expunged from the league's records.

For the 2017–18 season the club were renamed Halkyn Mountain Football Club and were again granted a place in the Clwyd East Football League. The club again withdrew from the league, this time in August 2018 before any matches were played.

"The Derby" is against neighbours Holywell Town. Other local/rival clubs include Rhydymwyn, Brynford United, Flint Town United, Mold Alexandra, Sychdyn, Caerwys, Greenfield.

Recent history

First team honours

League
Halkyn Mountain League
Champions: 1955–56
Clwyd Football League Division 1
Champions: 1992–93
Clwyd Football League Premier
Champions: 1994–95
Welsh Alliance League
Champions: 1999–2000

Cups
Halkyn Mountain League Cup 
Winners: 1958–59, 1974–75
Halkyn Mountain League Challenge Cup
Winners: 1972–73, 1974–75
Arrows Cup 
Winners: 1993–94
Clwyd League President Cup 
Winners: 1993–94
Mawddach Barritt Trophy
Winners: 1995–96
Cookson Cup
Winners: 1996–97

Reserve team honours

Cups
Halkyn Cup
Winners: 2013–14

References

External links
Official site
Official Twitter account

Welsh Alliance League clubs
Sport in Flintshire
Football clubs in Wales
Association football clubs established in 1945
1945 establishments in Wales
Cymru Alliance clubs
Clwyd Football League clubs